Halliste Parish was a rural municipality of Estonia, in Viljandi County. In 2009, it had a population of 1,808 (as of 1 January 2009) and an area of 267.09 km².

After the municipal elections held on 15 October 2017, Halliste Parish was merged with Abja and Karksi parishes and the town of Mõisaküla to form a new Mulgi Parish.

Settlements
Small boroughs
Halliste - Õisu
Villages
Ereste - Hõbemäe - Kaarli - Kalvre - Kulla - Maru - Mõõnaste - Mulgi - Naistevalla - Niguli - Päidre - Päigiste - Pornuse - Raja - Rimmu - Saksaküla - Sammaste - Tilla - Toosi - Ülemõisa - Uue-Kariste - Vabamatsi - Vana-Kariste

Gallery

References

External links